Carbuyer is a web publication that offers car reviews, news and advice for the British market, with a focus on new rather than used cars. It was launched by Dennis Publishing in 2010, and was first published on 29 October 2010, and is intended primarily for consumers rather than auto enthusiasts. The site includes facts and figures from JATO, allowing visitors to access specifications for every new model.

Carbuyer produces its own video reviews, fronted by journalists and presenters James Batchelor and Ginny Buckley which are published on the website and on its YouTube channel.
Mat Watson and Rebecca Jackson have been previous presenters. The website was short listed for Launch 2011 at the AOP Awards 2011, and then won Product Development of the Year (Consumer) at the PPA Data & Digital Publishing Awards 2011.

It was also awarded the Plain English Campaign's Internet Crystal Mark in August 2011.

In January 2014, Carbuyer refreshed its image with a new logo, new video graphics and website design. Carbuyer also publishes a quarterly magazine has also published a book Carbuyer's Top 100 Family Cars. In January 2014, Carbuyer launched its first ever television commercial.

In 2021, Carbuyer and the rest of Dennis Publishing's automotive assets were spun-off as independent company called Autovia.

Cars of the Year
2011: Kia Sportage
2012: Hyundai i30
2013: Dacia Duster
2014: Hyundai i10
2015: Citroën C4 Cactus
2016: Peugeot 3008
2017: Peugeot 3008
2018: Ford Fiesta
2019: Ford Fiesta
2020: Renault Clio
2021: Kia Sorento
2022: Hyundai Tucson
2023: Kia Niro

See also
 Auto Express
 Evo

References

External links
Carbuyer website

Automobile magazines published in the United Kingdom
British review websites
Magazines established in 2010